Do Jasoos is a 1975 Hindi comedy drama film. Produced and directed by Naresh Kumar, the film stars Raj Kapoor, Rajendra Kumar, Aruna Irani, Prem Chopra, Kamal Kapoor, Farida Jalal and Asit Sen. The music is by Ravindra Jain.

Plot 
Dharamchand and Karamchand, are two detectives who are on the trail of a millionaire's missing daughter. In their efforts to save the girl, who is an eyewitness to a murder, they fall into a series of comic situations because the photograph they have is that of the friend of Bhavana. Eventually, they also succeed in busting a smugglers' gang.

Cast

Shailendra Singh (singer) as Ashok Sinha
Bhavna Bhatt as Pinky Verma
Raj Kapoor as Dharamchand Jasoos
Rajendra Kumar as Karamchand Jasoos
Prem Chopra as Prem Chopra
Kamal Kapoor as Motilal Sippy
Sujit Kumar as G.L.Sippy
Manmohan Krishna as V.N. Sinha
Dulari (actress) as Sarita Devi Verma
Asit Sen as Nihalchand Khushalchand
Farida Jalal as Hema Nihalchand
Ram Avtar as  Mr.Johnson
Sunder (actor) as Mr. Thompson
Raj Kishore as Goon of Prem Chopra
Aruna Irani as Chammia Dancer
Moolchand as Dancer in the New Year party

Music 
Lyrics are written by Hasrat Jaipuri and Ravindra Jain

"Dariya Cha Raaja Deva" – Lata Mangeshkar, Shailendra Singh part of this song is copied from Woyaya by Ghanaian Afro-pop band Osibisa released in 1971
"Happy New Year To You" – Shailendra Singh
"Main Bijali Hoon Titali Hoon" – Lata Mangeshkar, Shailendra Singh
"Allaah Meri Tauba" – Asha Bhosle
"Do Jasoos Kare" – Mohammed Rafi, Mukesh
"Saal Mubaarak Saaheb Ji" – Mohammed Rafi, Mukesh
"Chadh Gayi Chadh Gayi" – Mohammed Rafi, Mukesh, [Inderjeet singh Tulsi]

References

External links 
 

1975 films
1970s Hindi-language films
Films scored by Ravindra Jain
Indian detective films
Indian comedy-drama films
1975 comedy-drama films